North Red River is an unorganized territory located in Kittson County, Minnesota, United States. The area was organized as a civil township, North Red River Township, until Kittson County dissolved the township in 2000 following a vote in the Minnesota legislature that allowed the county to do so without an election. In 2000, the township had a population of three, and as of the 2010 census, the territory had a total population of zero.

Geography
According to the United States Census Bureau, the territory has a total area of 23.7 square miles (61.4 km2), of which 23.4 square miles (60.6 km2) is land and 0.3 square mile (0.8 km2; 1.31%) is water.

Demographics
As of the census of 2000, there were 3 people, 2 households, and 1 family residing in the township. The population density was 0.1 people per square mile (0.0/km2). There were 4 housing units at an average density of 0.2/sq mi (0.1/km2). The racial makeup of the township was 100.00% White.

There were 2 households, out of which none had children under the age of 18 living with them, none were married couples living together, none had a female householder with no husband present, and 50.0% were non-families. 50.0% of all households were made up of individuals, and none had someone living alone who was 65 years of age or older.  The average household size was 1.50 and the average family size was 2.00.

In the township the population was spread out, with 1 person from 18 to 24, 1 person from 45 to 64, and 1 person who was 65 years of age or older. The median age was 54 years. There was 1 female and 2 males in the township, all over the age of 18.

The median income for a household in the township was $13,750, and the median income for a family was $18,750. The per capita income for the township was $8,983. 1 of the 3 people was below the poverty line.

References

Populated places in Kittson County, Minnesota
Unorganized territories in Minnesota
Populated places disestablished in 2000
Defunct townships in Minnesota